Aleyn is a surname. Notable people with the surname include:

Simon Aleyn (died 1565), the likely subject of the famous ballad, "The Vicar of Bray"
Charles Aleyn (died c. 1640), English poet
William Aleyn (fl. 1430–1448), English pirate
John Aleyn (disambiguation)